Yeşilçevre is a village in the Baykan District of Siirt Province in Turkey. The village is populated by Kurds of the Poran tribe and had a population of 175 in 2021.

The hamlet of Bahçeli, Çukurtaş, Doğruyol and Eri are attached to Yeşilçevre.

References 

Kurdish settlements in Siirt Province
Villages in Baykan District